Henicopernis is a genus of bird of prey in the family Accipitridae.

Species
It contains the following species:

Both species are endemic to New Guinea.  Genetic research has found that they are closely related to the Australian endemic square-tailed kite (Lophoictinia isura) and black-breasted buzzard (Hamirostra melanosternon), all sharing a 3-base-pair deletion in the RAG-1 gene.  The four species form a monophyletic clade sister to Aviceda within the subfamily Perninae. It has been proposed that they could be united into a single genus, Hamirostra having precedence.

References

 
Bird genera

Taxa named by George Robert Gray
Taxonomy articles created by Polbot